Gluteal vein can refer to:

 Superior gluteal veins
 Inferior gluteal veins